Boseongicola is a Gram-negative and aerobic genus of bacteria from the family of Rhodobacteraceae with one known species (Boseongicola aestuarii). Boseongicola aestuarii has been isolated from tidal flat sediments from Boseong in Korea.

References

Rhodobacteraceae
Bacteria genera
Monotypic bacteria genera